The Hellenikon Metropolitan Park (also called "the Ellinikon") is an urban development under construction in Hellinikon, Athens, Greece, on the site of the former Hellenikon International Airport.

It is to include a park as well as luxury homes, hotels, a casino, a marina, shops, and offices and will have Greece's tallest buildings reaching up to 200 meters in height. Construction had been scheduled to begin in 2008 and be completed by 2013, but the plans were shelved in the midst of the financial crisis. In July 2020, work began on the park and is due to be completed in 2024, while the Riviera Tower and Hard Rock Hotel Casino are due to be completed by 2026.

Outline 
The park is planned to encompass 400 hectares, while another 100 hectares will be used for housing and office facilities. It is to be the largest urban park in Europe, surpassing London's Hyde Park (250 hectares) as well as New York's Central Park (350 hectares). The Riviera Tower and Hard Rock Hotel Casino will be the tallest buildings in the development reaching 200 metres in height, the tallest buildings in Greece.

History
In 2005, an international team led by architects David Serero, Elena Fernandez and landscape architect Philippe Coignet won the international competition to design a metropolitan park on the former site of the Hellenikon Airport, over more than 300 teams of architects.

The competition was sponsored by UIA (International Union of Architects), the Greek Ministry of Environment and the Organization for the Planning and Environmental Protection of Athens (ORSA). The project was further developed in 2006 and 2007 by this team through two development phases with the planning organizations of Athens.

Serero's team developed a strategy to landscape and urbanize the 530 hectares of the Hellenikon site by using natural running water patterns on the site as a concept to design the largest sustainable park in Europe. The water used by the park is effectively originating up to 80% of water collected naturally on the site. The project is structured by seven north–south green valleys that are called “Softscapes”. The “Softscapes” are irrigated corridors that channel and collect rainwater of the site and from the  water catchment basin of the surrounding hills. These strips integrate a playful work on artificial topography that both guides the water and create terraces and slopes for the park activities and programs. There will also be some MTB downhill tracks, like the ones on Imittos mountain.

In 2013, a version of  design for the park was submitted as part of The Hellinikon Project. The team included Foster & Partners, Charles Anderson Landscape Architecture, ARUP and a large group of Greece design consultants. The design was revised and resubmitted to the Greek government in 2018. In July 2020, work began on the project.

References

External links
The Hellenic Ministry of the Environment, Physical Planning and Public Works – Hellenikon Metropolitan Park
Athens News Agency: News in English, 06-06-08 – 'Metropolitan Park' in southern Athens
Arch'it Architetture / Iterae Architecture. Hellenikon Metropolitan Park
 Greek Reporter, 15 Septembre 2019
http://www.orsa.gr
http://www.serero.com
http://www.o-l-m.net

Parks in Greece
Geography of Attica
Elliniko-Argyroupoli